Bhagwati Charan Vohra (15 November 1903 – 28 May 1930) was an Indian revolutionary, associated with Hindustan Socialist Republican Association. He was an ideologue, organiser, orator and a campaigner.

Early life
Bhagwati was born in 1903 in the family of a senior railway officer named Shiv Charan Vohra who was conferred with title of 'Rai Bahadur' by British Raj in 1919 for his services and loyalty. He married Durgawati Devi D/O Shri Banka Bihari from Allahabad. Vohra and Devi were blessed with their first child in December 1925, a boy whom they named Sachindra. Vohra passed intermediate science from F. C. college in 1921 and again took admission after the call-off of the non-cooperation movement in National College, Lahore, which was opened by Lala Lajpat Rai for Indian students who are not able to go in Government Colleges.

Revolutionary life
Vohra left college to join the non-cooperation movement in 1921, and after the movement was called off, joined National College, Lahore where he got a BA degree. It was there that he was initiated into the revolutionary movement. He along with Bhagat Singh and Sukhdev started a study circle on the model of the Russian Socialist Revolution.

Vohra was an avid reader. He played a key role in infusing intellectual ideology in the functioning roots of the organizations he worked with. He was not influenced by caste prejudices and worked for Hindu-Muslim unity as well as the upliftment of the poor by use of socialist principles.

In 1926, when the Naujawan Bharat Sabha revolutionary organization was formed by his friend, he was appointed the propaganda secretary of the organization. On 6 April 1928, Vohra and Bhagat Singh prepared the manifesto of Naujwan Bharat Sabha and urged the young Indians to have the triple motto "service, suffering, sacrifice", as their sole guide to achieve the goal of independence.

In September 1928, many young revolutionaries met at Ferozshah Kotla ground in Delhi and reorganized the Hindustan Republican Association into the Hindustan Socialist Republican Association (HSRA) under the leadership Chandrashekhar Azad. Vohra was appointed Propaganda Secretary and prepared the HSRA manifesto that was widely distributed at the time of the Lahore Session of the Congress. He was also party to murder of J. P. Saunders and the throwing of bombs in Central Assembly Hall by Singh and Batukeshwar Dutt.

Philosophy of bomb
In 1929 he rented room No. 69, Kashmir Building, Lahore and used it as a bomb factory. He planned and executed the 23 December 1929 bomb blast under the train of Viceroy Lord Irwin on the Delhi-Agra railway line. The viceroy escaped unhurt and Mahatma Gandhi thanked God for the narrow escape, condemning the revolutionary act through his article The Cult of Bomb.

In response to Gandhi's article, Vohra, in consultation with Azad, wrote an article entitled The Philosophy of Bomb. It appealed to youths to come forward and join them.

The concluding paragraph of the article reads

Death
Vohra died in Lahore on 28 May 1930 while testing a bomb on the banks of the Ravi. The device was required for the proposed rescue of Singh and others under trial in the Lahore Conspiracy Case but it exploded during the test and he was severely wounded.

He was survived by his wife Durgawati Devi (popularly known as Durga Bhabhi to the revolutionaries) and a son, Sachindra Vohra.

See also
Ram Prasad Bismil
Kakori Train Robbery
Revolutionary movement for Indian independence
Manmath Nath Gupta
Delhi Conspiracy Commission

References

1903 births
1930 deaths
People from Agra
Gujarati people
Indian revolutionaries
Deaths by explosive device
Hindustan Socialist Republican Association